The Aerodynamische Versuchsanstalt (AVA) in Göttingen was one of the four predecessor organizations of the 1969 founded "German Research and Experimental Institute for Aerospace", which in 1997  was renamed in German Aerospace Center (DLR).

History 

The AVA was created in 1919 from the 1907 Göttingen by Ludwig Prandtl founded "Modellversuchsanstalt für Aerodynamik der Motorluftschiff-Studiengesellschaft". In its founding years, it was still concerned with the development of the "best" form of airship. In 1908, the first wind tunnel was built in Göttingen for tests on models for aviation. In 1915, founded in 1911 Kaiser Wilhelm Society (KWG) and under the direction of Ludwig Prandtl the "Modellversuchsanstalt aerodynamics" was founded in 1919 as the "Aerodynamic Research Institute of the Kaiser Wilhelm Society" (AVA) was transferred to the KWG and converted in 1925 into the "Kaiser Wilhelm Institute for Flow Research linked to the Aerodynamic Research Institute".

Ludwig Prandtl headed the institute until 1937, his successor became Albert Betz. In the same year a spin-off from the institute took place under the name "Aerodynamische Versuchsanstalt Göttingen e. V. in the Kaiser Wilhelm Society ", in which the Reich Ministry of Aviation was involved.
The remaining after the spin-off part was continued under the name "Kaiser Wilhelm Institute for Flow Research" from the 1948, the Max Planck Institute for Fluid Research (today Max Planck Institute for Dynamics and Self-Organization).

The AVA was confiscated in 1945 by the British (until 1948), 1953 as "Aerodynamic Research Institute Göttingen e. V. re-opened in the Max Planck Society and fully integrated in 1956 as the "Aerodynamic Research Institute in the Max Planck Society".

In 1969, the spin-off from the Max Planck Society and the founding of the "German Research and Experimental Institute for Aerospace e. V.".

Bibliography 
 Aerodynamische Versuchsanstalt Göttingen e.V. in der Kaiser-Wilhelm-/Max-Planck-Gesellschaft (CPTS), in: Eckart Henning, Marion Kazemi: Handbuch zur Institutsgeschichte der Kaiser-Wilhelm-/ Max-Planck-Gesellschaft zur Förderung der Wissenschaften 1911–2011 – Daten und Quellen, Berlin 2016, 2 subvolumes, volume 1: Institute und Forschungsstellen A–L (online, PDF, 75 MB), pages 27–45 (Chronologie des Instituts)

Sources 
 Historie des DLR – Gesellschaft von Freunden des DLR e. V.
 100 Jahre DLR – Homepage des DLR
 Archiv zur Geschichte der Max-Planck-Gesellschaft

Former research institutes
Aerodynamics
Education in Göttingen
Max Planck Institutes
Aviation history of Germany
1907 establishments in Germany
1969 disestablishments in Germany
Science and technology in Germany
History of Lower Saxony